SS Richard Bassett was a Liberty ship built in the United States during World War II. She was named after Founding Father Richard Bassett, a Delaware attorney and politician, veteran of the American Revolutionary War, delegate to the Constitutional Convention of 1787, signer of the United States Constitution, United States Senator from Delaware, Chief Justice of the Delaware Court of Common Pleas, Governor of Delaware and a United States circuit judge of the United States Circuit Court for the Third Circuit. He holds the overall seniority position of #1 in the history of the United States Senate.

Construction
Richard Bassett was laid down on 18 March 1942, under a Maritime Commission (MARCOM) contract, MCE hull 41, by the Bethlehem-Fairfield Shipyard, Baltimore, Maryland; sponsored by Mrs. J.F. McInnis, the wife of the MARCOM Eastcoast Regional Director, and was launched on 22 May 1942.

History
She was allocated to A. H. Bull Steamship Company, on 13 June 1942. On 26 March 1947, she was sold for commercial use to the Baltimore Insular Line, for $544,506. On 29 August 1961, she was used for an exchange with the Maritime Administration (MARAD). On 5 September 1961, she was laid up in the Hudson River Reserve Fleet, Jones Point, New York. She was sold for scrapping on 29 October 1962, to Union Minerals & Alloys Corp.

References

Bibliography

 
 
 
 

 

Liberty ships
Ships built in Baltimore
1942 ships
Hudson River Reserve Fleet
Ships named for Founding Fathers of the United States